Ruan Jianping is a Chinese cyclist. She won the bronze medal at the Women's C4–5 500 meter time trial event at the 2016 Summer Paralympics with 36.557.

References

Living people
Cyclists at the 2016 Summer Paralympics
Medalists at the 2016 Summer Paralympics
Paralympic bronze medalists for China
Paralympic cyclists of China
Chinese female cyclists
Year of birth missing (living people)
Paralympic medalists in cycling
Cyclists at the 2020 Summer Paralympics
21st-century Chinese women